Jackie Brown is a 1997 American crime film written and directed by Quentin Tarantino, based on Elmore Leonard's 1992 novel Rum Punch. It stars Pam Grier as Jackie Brown, a flight attendant who is caught smuggling money. Samuel L. Jackson, Robert Forster, Bridget Fonda, Michael Keaton, and Robert De Niro appear in supporting roles.

Jackie Brown pays homage to 1970s blaxploitation films, particularly Coffy (1973) and Foxy Brown (1974), both of which also starred Grier. It is the only feature-length film that Tarantino has adapted from another work.

Jackie Brown revitalized the careers of Grier and Forster, neither of whom had been cast in a lead role for many years. It earned a nomination for the Academy Award for Best Supporting Actor for Forster, and Golden Globe Award nominations for Jackson and Grier. It was released on December 25, 1997, received positive reviews and grossed $74 million worldwide.

Plot

Jackie Brown, a flight attendant, smuggles money from Mexico into the United States for Ordell Robbie, a gun runner in Los Angeles. When Ordell's courier, Beaumont Livingston, is arrested, he hires bail bondsman Max Cherry to bail him out. To prevent Beaumont from talking to the police, Ordell kills him.

Acting on information Beaumont had already given them, ATF agent Ray Nicolette and LAPD detective Mark Dargus intercept Jackie with Ordell's cash and a bag of cocaine. After Jackie is sent to jail, Ordell hires Max to bail her out. Ordell arrives at Jackie's apartment, but she pulls out a gun she stole from Max's glovebox. She negotiates a deal with Ordell: she will pretend to help the authorities while smuggling in $550,000 of Ordell's money.

Ordell brings in Louis Gara, a criminal associate and former cellmate just released from prison. Meanwhile, Melanie Ralston, one of Ordell's women, attempts to convince Louis to betray Ordell and take the money for themselves. Louis tells Ordell, but Ordell replies that he is not concerned about her.

Unaware of the plan to smuggle in $550,000, Nicolette and Dargus devise a sting to catch Ordell during a transfer of $50,000. Jackie plans to keep the $500,000 for herself. She recruits Max, offering him a cut. During a test run, Jackie smuggles in $10,000, with Nicolette and Dargus aware, to swap with Sheronda, Ordell's live-in girlfriend, at a shopping mall. After Jackie leaves, Max observes an unknown woman swap bags with Sheronda. He informs Jackie and she confronts Ordell, who states he used Simone Hawkins, one of his contacts, to secure his money as backup.

On the day of the transfer, Ordell discovers that Simone has left town with the $10,000. He reluctantly recruits Melanie to perform the swap instead. Jackie enters a dressing room in a department store to try on a suit. Though she has told Nicolette the exchange will take place in the food court, she has told Ordell she will swap bags in the dressing room. The bag contains only $40,000; Jackie leaves the rest in the dressing room for Max. Jackie takes $10,000 and places it on top of the bag she gives Melanie as a bonus. Jackie runs to the food court and finds Nicolette, claiming Melanie burst into the dressing room and stole the money.

In the parking lot, Melanie mocks Louis for forgetting where they parked. He loses his temper and kills her. Louis tells Ordell, who discovers that most of the money is missing. When Louis recalls seeing Max at the shopping mall, Ordell, furious, kills Louis.

Ordell instructs Max to tell Jackie that Ordell will kill them if she does not return the money, and that if she goes to the police, he will name her as an accessory. Max goes to Ordell's house and tells him that Jackie, frightened, is waiting in Max's office with the money. Ordell holds Max at gunpoint as they enter his office. Jackie yells out that Ordell has a gun. Nicolette, Dargus, and Winston, hiding in the back, ambush him and shoot him dead. The charges against Jackie are dropped, and she plans a trip to Madrid. Max declines her invitation to join her. They kiss goodbye and he watches her drive away.

Cast

Production

Development
After completing Pulp Fiction (1994), Quentin Tarantino and Roger Avary acquired the film rights to Elmore Leonard's novels Rum Punch, Freaky Deaky, and Killshot. Tarantino initially planned to film either Freaky Deaky or Killshot and have another director make Rum Punch, but changed his mind after re-reading Rum Punch, saying he "fell in love" with the novel all over again. Killshot was later adapted into a film, produced by Jackie Brown producer Lawrence Bender. 

While adapting Rum Punch into a screenplay, Tarantino changed the ethnicity of the main character from white to black, as well as renaming her from Burke to Brown, titling the screenplay Jackie Brown. Tarantino hesitated to discuss the changes with Leonard, finally speaking with Leonard as the film was about to start shooting. Leonard loved the screenplay, considering it not only the best of the twenty-six screen adaptations of his novels and short stories, but also stating that it was possibly the best screenplay he had ever read.

Tarantino's screenplay otherwise closely followed Leonard's novel, incorporating elements of Tarantino's trademark humor and pacing. The screenplay was also influenced by blaxploitation films, but Tarantino said Jackie Brown is not a blaxploitation film.

Jackie Brown alludes to Grier's career in many ways. The film's poster resembles those of Grier's films Coffy (1973) and Foxy Brown (1974) and includes quotes from both films. The typeface for the film's opening titles was also used for those of Foxy Brown; some of the background music is taken from these films including four songs from Roy Ayers's original score for Coffy.

The film's opening sequence recreates that of The Graduate (1967), in which Dustin Hoffman passes wearily through Los Angeles International Airport past white tiles to a somber "The Sound of Silence" by Simon and Garfunkel. In Jackie Brown, Grier glides by blue tiles in the same spot on a moving sidewalk in the same direction to a soaring soul music song, "Across 110th Street" by Bobby Womack, which is from the film of the same name that was a part of the blaxploitation genre, just like Foxy Brown and Coffy.

Casting
Tarantino wanted Pam Grier to play the title character. She previously read for the Pulp Fiction character Jody, but Tarantino did not believe audiences would find it plausible for Eric Stoltz to yell at her. Grier did not expect Tarantino to contact her after the success of Pulp Fiction. When she showed up to read for Jackie Brown, Tarantino had posters of her films in his office. She asked if he had put them up because she was coming to read for his film, and he responded that he was actually planning to take them down before her audition, to avoid making it look like he wanted to impress her. 

Several years after the release of the movie, Sylvester Stallone claimed that he turned down the role of Louis Gara. Tarantino considered Paul Newman, Gene Hackman and John Saxon for the role of Max Cherry, before casting Robert Forster.

Out of Sight
While Jackie Brown was in production, Universal Pictures was preparing to begin production on director Steven Soderbergh's Out of Sight, an adaptation of the Leonard novel of the same name that also features the character of Ray Nicolette, and waited to see whom Tarantino would cast as Nicolette for Jackie Brown. Michael Keaton was hesitant to take the part of Ray Nicolette, even though Tarantino wanted him for it. Keaton subsequently agreed to play Nicolette again in Out of Sight, uncredited, appearing in one brief scene. Although the legal rights to the character were held by Tarantino and Miramax, as Jackie Brown had been produced first, Tarantino insisted that the studio not charge Universal for using the character in Out of Sight, allowing the character's appearance without Miramax receiving financial compensation.

Reception

Critical response
Review aggregation website Rotten Tomatoes gives it an approval rating of 86% based on 87 reviews, and an average rating of 7.5/10. The site's consensus is: "Although somewhat lackadaisical in pace, Jackie Brown proves to be an effective star-vehicle for Pam Grier while offering the usual Tarantino wit and charm." Metacritic gives the film a 64 out of 100 based on 23 critic reviews, indicating "generally favorable reviews". Audiences polled by CinemaScore gave the film an average grade of "B" on an A+ to F scale.

Roger Ebert rated the film four out of four stars, writing that "Tarantino leaves the hardest questions for last, hides his moves, conceals his strategies in plain view, and gives his characters dialogue that is alive, authentic and spontaneous." He also ranked the film as one of his favorites of 1997. Movie critic Mark Kermode for BBC Radio Five Live lists Jackie Brown as his favorite film by Quentin Tarantino. Samuel L. Jackson, who appears frequently in Tarantino's films, named his character of Ordell Robbie as one of his favorite roles.

Box office
The film grossed $39.7million in the United States and Canada and $35.1million in other territories for a total gross of $74.7million, against a budget of $12million. In its opening weekend, the film grossed $9.3million, finishing 5th at the box office.

Controversy
Jackie Brown has attracted criticism for its use of the racial slur "nigger", which is used 38 times, the most in any Tarantino film until Django Unchained (2012) and The Hateful Eight (2015). During an interview with Manohla Dargis, Tarantino said: "The minute any word has that much power, as far as I'm concerned, everyone on the planet should scream it. No word deserves that much power." The filmmaker Spike Lee criticized the film's use of the word, and said: "I'm not against the word, and I use it, but not excessively. And some people speak that way. But, Quentin is infatuated with that word. What does he want to be madean honorary black man? And he uses it in all his pictures: Pulp Fiction and Reservoir Dogs... I want Quentin to know that all African-Americans do not think that word is trendy or slick." Lee took his concerns to the film's producers, Harvey Weinstein and Lawrence Bender. 

The film critic Pascoe Soyurz said, "I wouldn't necessarily align myself with Spike Lee, but I do have some reservations about a film of this kind coming out at this time. It seems to me there's a kind of culture-vulture feel to it. I'm concerned about the whole 'blaxploitation' thing. Hollywood is a dream factory but it was Hollywood that created some of the most negative images of black people, which had major effects on the way we were perceived around the world." He concludes by stating that Tarantino's use of the word "devalues the word and the word has a lot of significance."

Awards

Grier and Jackson were nominated for Golden Globe Awards (Grier for Best ActressMotion Picture Musical or Comedy and Jackson for Best ActorMotion Picture Musical or Comedy). Forster was nominated for an Academy Award for Best Supporting Actor. The film was also nominated for the prestigious Grand Prix of the Belgian Syndicate of Cinema Critics.

At the 48th Berlin International Film Festival, Jackson won the Silver Bear for Best Actor award.

Soundtrack

The soundtrack album for Jackie Brown, entitled Jackie Brown: Music from the Miramax Motion Picture, was released on December 9, 1997.

Songs by a variety of artists are heard throughout the film, including The Delfonics' "La-La Means I Love You" and "Didn't I (Blow Your Mind This Time)", Bill Withers' "Who Is He", The Grass Roots' "Midnight Confessions", Johnny Cash's "Tennessee Stud", Bloodstone's "Natural High", and Foxy Brown's "(Holy Matrimony) Married to the Firm". There are several songs included that were featured in blaxploitation films as well, including Bobby Womack's "Across 110th Street", from the film of the same name, and Pam Grier's "Long Time Woman", from her 1971 film The Big Doll House. The original soundtrack also features separate tracks with dialogue from the film. Instead of using a new film score, Tarantino incorporated Roy Ayers' funk score from the film Coffy.

A number of songs used in the film do not appear on the soundtrack, such as "Cissy Strut" (The Meters), and "Piano Impromptu" (Dick Walters).

Home media
The Special Edition DVD, released by Buena Vista in 2002, includes an introduction from Tarantino, an hour-long retrospective interview, a subtitle trivia track and soundtrack chapter selection, a half-hour making-of documentary ("How It Went Down"), the entire "Chicks Who Love Guns" video as seen in the film, many deleted and alternate scenes, including an alternate opening title sequence, Siskel and Ebert's review, Jackie Brown appearances on MTV, TV spots and theatrical trailers, written reviews and articles and filmographies, and over an hour of trailers for Pam Grier and Robert Forster films dating from the 1960s onwards. The box also includes a mini-poster of the film, similar to the one above, and on the back of that, two other mini-postersone of Grier, the other of Forster, both similar to the album cover.

Although the Special Edition DVD's back cover states that the film is presented in a 2.35:1 aspect ratio, it was actually shot with a 1.85:1 ratio, the only Tarantino-directed film to date shot in such a format with the exception of his segment in the film Four Rooms, "The Man from Hollywood".

On October 4, 2011, Miramax released Jackie Brown on Blu-ray Disc along with Pulp Fiction. The film is presented in 1080p HD in its original 1.85:1 aspect ratio with a DTS-HD Master Audio 5.1 soundtrack. The disc was the result of a new licensing deal with Miramax and Lionsgate.

See also
 Life of Crime (2013)
 Heist film

References

External links

 
 
 
 
 

1997 films
1997 crime drama films
1997 crime thriller films
1997 independent films
1990s English-language films
1990s heist films
1990s thriller drama films
A Band Apart films
American crime drama films
American crime thriller films
American heist films
American independent films
American neo-noir films
American thriller drama films
Bureau of Alcohol, Tobacco, Firearms and Explosives in fiction
African-American-related controversies in film
African-American films
Blaxploitation films
Fictional portrayals of the Los Angeles Police Department
Films about cocaine
Films based on American novels
Films based on works by Elmore Leonard
Films directed by Quentin Tarantino
Films produced by Lawrence Bender
Films set in 1995
Films set in Los Angeles
Films shot in Los Angeles
Films with screenplays by Quentin Tarantino
Miramax films
Films about flight attendants
1990s American films